Cutch State Railway (CSR) was an isolated  narrow gauge railway in Cutch State, one of the princely states allied to Britain in India.

History 
The railway was financed by the Maharao Khengarji Bawa of Cutch State. The laying of first rails started in 1900-01, from Tuna to Anjar, which became operational in 1905. The works for lines from Anjar to the then state capital Bhuj started in 1901-02 and completed in 1908. A further addition of 32 miles was done in 1912 from Varsamedi (near Anjar) to Bhachau and further extension of 15 miles up to Kandla port was started at the end of 1930 and completed in 1932. The narrow gauge lines of CSR were laid by Mistris of Kutch and the services of British engineers were also employed. The railway was owned, managed and operated by Cutch State.

In 1940 the railway carried 300,000 passengers, while the main freight traffic was cotton, grain and sugar. The railway used four small  type locomotives, later supplemented by three 25 ton  locomotives. The Maharao owned a petrol railcar designed by Everard Calthrop, which the Maharao used as a shooting car on his hunting expeditions.

The Cutch State Railways continued to operate as separate system (even after independence of India and merger of the Princely State of Cutch) until the railway was merged into the Western Railway on 5 November 1951, at which time the total length was 72 miles.

Rolling stock
In 1936, the company owned 6 locomotives, 7 railcars, 15 coaches and 66 goods wagons.

Classification
It was labeled as a Class III railway according to Indian Railway Classification System of 1926.

Conversion to broad gauge
The railway has been connected to Indian Railways and is under conversion to  broad gauge.

References 

Transport in Bhuj
2 ft 6 in gauge railways in India
Defunct railway companies of India
History of rail transport in Gujarat
Transport in Kutch district
History of Kutch
Railway companies established in 1900
Railway companies disestablished in 1951
1951 disestablishments in India
Indian companies established in 1900